Raymond Jones (born 12 October 1958) is a New Zealand former cricketer. He played first-class cricket for Canterbury and Otago between 1980 and 1985.

See also
 List of Otago representative cricketers

References

External links
 

1958 births
Living people
New Zealand cricketers
Canterbury cricketers
Otago cricketers
Cricketers from Christchurch